Pierre Bellemare (21 October 1929 – 26 May 2018) was a French writer, novelist, radio personality, television presenter, TV producer, director, and actor.

Television
 La Tête et les Jambes
 La Caméra invisible
 J'ai un Secret : (26 September 1982 – 18 December 1983)
 Les Grosses Têtes : (February 1990 – March 1996) 
 Le Bigdil : (2 February 1998 – 23 July 2004) – Anthony, the bison 
 Drôle de jeu : (March 1998 – June 1999) – Anthony, the bison 
 Crésus : (4 July 2005 – 1 September 2006) – mister Ghost 
 En toutes lettres : (September 2009 – June 2011) – the animator with Julien Courbet.

Bibliography
 DAVID, Jean-Marie. "Bellemare, Pierre". In Dictionnaire des littératures policières (vol. 1, A-I), under the direction of Claude Mesplède. Nantes : Joseph K., nov. 2007, p. 197. (Temps noir).

Filmography

Radio
 Since 2013 : Les pieds dans le plat on Europe 1

References

External links
 Official site
 Biography

1929 births
2018 deaths
People from Boulogne-Billancourt
Burials at Père Lachaise Cemetery
20th-century French male actors
French radio presenters
French radio producers
French television presenters
French television producers
French male television actors
French crime fiction writers
Writers from Île-de-France
20th-century French non-fiction writers
20th-century French male writers
21st-century French non-fiction writers
21st-century French male actors
French game show hosts
French male film actors
French male novelists